Johannes Demantke (born 17 May 1949) is an Austrian footballer. He played in four matches for the Austria national football team from 1970 to 1976.

References

External links
 
 

1949 births
Living people
Austrian footballers
Austria international footballers
Footballers from Vienna
Association football midfielders
FC Admira Wacker Mödling players